The 2005–06 Czech 2. Liga was the 13th season of the 2. česká fotbalová liga, the second tier of the Czech football league.

Team changes

From 2. Liga
Promoted to Czech First League
 FK SIAD Most
 FC Vysočina Jihlava
 FC Viktoria Plzeň

Relegated to Bohemian Football League
 FK Tatran Prachatice
 Bohemians 1905

To 2. Liga
Relegated from Czech First League
 FK Drnovice
 SK České Budějovice
 SFC Opava

Promoted from Bohemian Football League
 SC Xaverov

Promoted from Moravian-Silesian Football League
 FC Hlučín

League standings

Top goalscorers

See also
 2005–06 Czech First League
 2005–06 Czech Cup

References

Official website 

Czech 2. Liga seasons
Czech
2005–06 in Czech football